Caer is a placename element in the Welsh language meaning "stronghold".

Caer can also refer to:
Chester, a city known as Caer in Welsh
Caër, a location in France
Caer Ibormeith, a figure in Irish mythology
Caer (album), a Twin Shadow album